Narikkuni is a town in Kozhikode district in the state of Kerala, India.  According to Census 2011 information the location code or village code of Narikkuni town is 627402. Narikkuni town is located in Kozhikode Tehsil of Kozhikode district in Kerala, India. It is situated 20 km away from Kozhikode, which is both the district and the sub-district headquarters of Narikkuni village.

The total geographical area of the village is 1785 hectares.  Narikkuni has a total population of 24,290 and about 5,785 houses.  Kozhikode is nearest town to Narikkuni which is approximately 20 km away.

Location and connectivity 
Narikkuni is located at a distance of about 20 km from Kozhikode, the district headquarters, and is well connected by road to the nearby towns. There are five main roads that span out from the Narikkuni city centre. Kozhikode is accessible by two routes, via the Narikkuni-Padanilam road (which spans 5.1 km and joins NH 766 at Padanilam) and the Kumaraswami Raja road. Narikkuni-Koduvally road is a 6.6 km stretch of road that connects Narikkuni to NH 766 at Koduvally. Poonoor is about 10 km away and can be reached by the Narikkuni-Poonoor road. The fifth road, the 8.3 km long Narikkuni-Nanminda road, leads to Nanminda and beyond. The town has a bus stand-cum-shopping complex and acts as the origin to the bus services to all the main surrounding places.

Administration 
Narikkuni village is administrated by Sarpanch (Panchayat President, or in other words, Head of the Village) who is the elected representative of the village. The panchayat Elections in 2020, saw the United Democratic Front winning 10 out of the 15 seats to secure a majority. Left Democratic Front emerged victorious in the remaining five seats. The Panchayat is currently headed by C.K. Saleem of UDF.

Important landmarks

 Government Higher Secondary School, Narikkuni
 Kuttamboor Higher Secondary school
 Narikkuni AUP School
 Community Health Centre, Narikkuni
 Naikkuni Bus Stand
 State Bank of India, Narikkuni
 Kerala Gramin Bank, Narikkuni
 Narikkuni KDC Bank
Nakhashi School of Music (Centre for both the South Indian and North Indian forms of Classical and semi classical music)
 Narikkuni Service Sahakarana Bank
 Narikkuni Fish Market and Slaughter House Complex
 Madavoor CM Makham
 Thavanoor Sri Vishnu Temple, Punnassery
 Sri Gurudeva Temple, Punnassery
 Kadambur Temple, Karakkunnath
 Thali Maha Temple, Nanmanda
 Ayyarvattom Maha Sudarshana Temple, Eravannur (The only sudarshana temple in Kerala)
 Parannur Mahadeva Temple, Parannur
 Parannur Juma Mashid
 Vadekkandi thazham Juma Masjid
Baranipara masjid
Parassery mukku masjid
Puthiyakavu sree bhaghavathi temple, Palangad

Suburbs and villages
 Barani para
 Poyilil
 Punnassery
 Karakkunnath
 Parannur
 Koolippoyil
 Vadekkandithazham
 Ambalappoyil 
 Nanminda 

 Eravannur
 Madavoor
 Palangad
 Vattapparapoyil

Notable persons 
Chandran Veyattummal/ Paris Chandran
Surabhi Lakshmi

References

Thamarassery area